List of works by American architect John Lautner.

Architecture lists